Dycheiidae is a wastebasket taxon containing problematic polyplacophora from Upper Cambrian strata in the USA.

References

Chitons